This is the complete list of Central American and Caribbean Games medalists in athletics from 1926 to 2018. Women's events have been held since 1938.

Men's medalists

100 metres

200 metres

400 metres

800 metres

1500 metres

3000 m steeplechase

5000 metres

10,000 metres

110 metres hurdles

400 metres hurdles

4 × 100 metres relay

4 × 400 metres relay

High jump

Pole vault

Long jump

Triple jump

Shot put

Discus throw

Hammer throw

Javelin throw

Pentathlon

Decathlon

Half marathon

Marathon

10km walk

20km walk

50km walk

Women's medalists

50 metres

100 metres

200 metres

400 metres

800 metres

1500 metres

3000 m

3000 m steeplechase

5000 metres

10,000 metres

80 metres hurdles

100 metres hurdles

400 metres hurdles

4 × 100 metres relay

4 × 400 metres relay

High jump

Pole vault

Long jump

Triple jump

Shot put

Discus throw

Hammer throw

Javelin throw

Pentathlon

Heptathlon

Marathon

10km walk

20km walk

References

Central American and Caribbean Games